The String Revolution is an international guitar ensemble originally composed of Markus Illko, Janet Robin, Daniel Schwarz, and Art Zavala Jr. formed in Los Angeles, California in 2015. The group transitioned to a trio in 2022 with the departures of Schwarz and Zavala and adding Cuban guitarist Rober Luis Gomez. The group's debut EP, Stringborn, was released in 2016 and was mixed and mastered by Matt Hyde (Rodrigo y Gabriela). Their follow-up EP, Red Drops, was released in 2019 and was also mixed and mastered by Hyde. Two additional singles "Figure 8" and "Crazy Train" were released in 2020 and 2022, respectively.

Career
Robin was inspired to form The String Revolution in 2015 several years after she performed in Lindsey Buckingham's solo band, which included five guitar players. Robin recruited the three original members of The String Revolution from the Los Angeles music scene. The members of the group perform mostly instrumental acoustic music and have diverse backgrounds as musicians representing different disciplines, including elements of rock, blues, classical, flamenco, bluegrass, alternative, and experimental.

The String Revolution's first EP, Stringborn, features an acoustic cover of Michael Jackson's "Billie Jean" that reached the Top 10 on the Spotify LA Instrumental Charts. A follow-up EP, Red Drops, was released in 2019 and features a cover of Sting's "Englishman in New York." Between those releases, The String Revolution also released a cover of Elton John's "Rocket Man." In September 2020, The String Revolution released the single "Figure 8." Music by the String Revolution has been streamed over four million times on Spotify.

The band has had several notable performances, including performing at the Festival of the Arts in Laguna Beach, California in 2017 and the River Spirit Festival in Hastings-on-Hudson, New York in 2019. In December 2019, The String Revolution performed at the Clive Davis Theater at the Grammy Museum in Los Angeles, California as part of the "Great Guitars" American Express Concert Series.

In January 2022, The String Revolution released a new instrumental version of the Ozzy Osbourne, Randy Rhoads, Bob Daisley song, "Crazy Train" with Billy Idol guitarist Steve Stevens as guest soloist. The group recorded the song in celebration of Rhoads into the Rock and Roll Hall of Fame. Robin was the youngest and only female guitar student taught by Rhoads.

Also in 2022, The String Revolution become a trio, with Cuban guitarist Rober Louis Gomez joining Illko and Robin in the band's new lineup.

Band members

Current members
 Markus Illko – guitar, banjitar, bass, vocals
 Janet Robin – guitar, banjitar
 Rober Luis Gomez - guitar

Former members
 Daniel Schwarz – guitar, slide guitar
 Art Zavala Jr. – guitar, banjitar, bass, vocals

Discography
2016: Stringborn, EP (String Revolution Music)
2019: "Rocket Man", Single (String Revolution Music)
2019: Red Drops, EP (String Revolution Music)
2020: "Figure 8", Single (String Revolution Music)
2022: "Crazy Train", Single (String Revolution Music

References

External links
 Official website

Musical groups established in 2015
Musical quartets
2015 establishments in California